Eric Roberts is an American politician and businessman serving as a member of the Oklahoma House of Representatives from the 83rd district. Elected in November 2020, he assumed office on January 11, 2021.

Education 
Roberts earned a Bachelor of Arts degree from Southern Methodist University.

Career 
Roberts has owned and operated Colonial Center LP for over 28 years. He was appointed to serve on the Oklahoma State Fairground Improvements Subcommittee by former Mayor Mick Cornett. He was elected to the Oklahoma House of Representatives in November 2020 and assumed office on January 11, 2021. He also serves as vice chair of the House Government Modernization and Efficiency Committee.

References 

Living people
Southern Methodist University alumni
Republican Party members of the Oklahoma House of Representatives
Year of birth missing (living people)
21st-century American politicians